Alexander Budman (Born February 15, 1973)  is a multi-instrumentalist, composer and arranger from Sacramento, California, United States. Alex lived in the San Francisco Bay Area from 1995-2005 and was best known there for leading the Contemporary Jazz Orchestra. He has lived in Los Angeles since 2005, playing mostly jazz and popular music. He plays the saxophone, clarinet, flute, keyboard and bass.

Albums as a leader
 From There to Here - Budman/Levy Orchestra
 Instruments of Mass Pleasure - Contemporary Jazz Orchestra
 Monday in the City - Contemporary Jazz Orchestra

Discography
Alex has recorded on hundreds of albums, television shows, and movies. A few album credits:

D'Angelo, Robbie Williams, Elvis Costello and the Roots, Clare Fischer, Rafael Saadiq, The Game, Spencer Day, Sam Phillips, Mavis Staples, Susan Tedeschi, Suzie McNeil, Leftover Cuties, Busta Rhymes, Richard Cheese, The Velvet Teen and Kiki Ebsen.

External links
 official website

References

American jazz musicians
Jazz musicians from California
Living people
1973 births